Nathan Louis Pond (born 5 January 1985) is a professional footballer who plays as a defender or defensive midfielder for  team Bamber Bridge.

He has previously played for Fleetwood Town over a fifteen-year period, whilst also having spells with Lancaster City, Kendal Town, Grimsby Town, Salford City, AFC Fylde and AFC Telford United. Internationally, he represents Montserrat, earning his first caps in 2019.

Having played in seven divisions for Fleetwood through the course of six promotions, Pond was recognised by Guinness as holding the world record for appearing in the most different divisions with a single football club.

Club career

Early career and Fleetwood Town
Pond began his career with Northern Premier League side Lancaster City in 2003. Later that year he transferred to Fleetwood Town.

Pond was the club's current longest-serving player, having played a club record of 498 matches since 2003. including six promotions, most notably the club's promotion to the Football League in 2012.

He joined Kendal Town on a month's loan in December 2010, making two appearances for the club. The loan was part of an agreement, due to the sale of Danny Rowe to Fleetwood.

On 10 August 2012, Pond joined Grimsby Town on an initial one-month loan. Having made his first appearance on 11 August against Southport at centre back, during the following game on 14 August he scored the opening goal in the 69th minute in the 2–1 home defeat against Stockport, a right-footed overhead kick in off the crossbar. After playing three times for Grimsby, Pond extended his loan stay until January 2013. On 8 September, he scored his second goal for Grimsby in a 1–0 victory against Forest Green Rovers, a glancing header from a Frankie Artus free-kick.

Following a successful loan spell, Grimsby looked into extending Pond's loan beyond January or possibly securing him on a permanent deal but on 1 January 2013 they admitted it was unlikely because Fleetwood were interested in taking the player back to look at him. Pond's final appearance for Grimsby in his loan spell brought his fifth goal of the season against Hereford United, two minutes into the game. Pond commented before his final game that the loan spell had been successful for both himself and the club and that he would relish the prospect of returning to Grimsby on a permanent deal in the January transfer window if he was unable to win back his place in the Fleetwood team. 

After signing a new contract in May 2015, Pond was named captain of Fleetwood. He signed new one year contracts in both June 2016, and January 2017, the latter with the option for an additional year.

He passed Jack Ainscough's record of 421 appearances for Fleetwood in the penultimate game of the 2015–16 season, ending the season on 423 appearances.

Fleetwood exercised a one-year contract extension for him at the end of the 2017–18 season.

Later career
In May 2018 he joined National League team Salford City, where he was reunited with Graham Alexander.

He was released on 16 May 2020.

On 7 August 2020 he joined AFC Fylde following his release from Salford. Having been made club captain, he made his debut on the opening day of the season, keeping a clean sheet in a 1–0 win over Darlington on 6 October. He was released from his contract in May 2021, with manager Jim Bentley saying it was his toughest decision as Fylde manager. Pond joined AFC Telford United in July 2021, Telford manager Gavin Cowan described the initial offer to Pond as "tongue-in-cheek", believing he wouldn't sign, but said Pond had ambitions of another promotion in his career. 

Pond was released on 30 September, following a 'wild challenge' that saw him earn a red card in an FA Cup tie with Stamford, with Cowan describing it as 'completely unacceptable' and that he 'couldn't stand by Pond'. 

On 6 October, he signed for Bamber Bridge.

International career
Pond was called up for Montserrat in October 2019 and made his debut on 13 October, playing 90 minutes against El Salvador. He scored his first goal in a 1–0 victory against St Lucia to ensure Montserrat progress to 2021 CONCACAF Gold Cup qualification.

Career statistics

Club

International

''Scores and results list Montserrat's goal tally first.

Honours
Fleetwood Town
North West Counties Football League Division One: 2004–05
Northern Premier League Division One runner-up: 2005–06
Northern Premier League Premier Division: 2007–08
Conference North play-offs: 2010
Conference Premier: 2011–12
Football League Two play-offs: 2014

Salford City
National League play-offs: 2019

References

External links

1985 births
Living people
Montserratian footballers
Montserrat international footballers
English footballers
English people of Montserratian descent
Association football defenders
Lancaster City F.C. players
Fleetwood Town F.C. players
Kendal Town F.C. players
Grimsby Town F.C. players
Salford City F.C. players
AFC Fylde players
AFC Telford United players
English Football League players
National League (English football) players
Northern Premier League players
Black British sportsmen